The Leaning Tower of Niles is a half-size replica of the Leaning Tower of Pisa.  Located in Niles, Illinois, it was completed in 1934 by industrialist Robert Ilg as part of a recreation park for employees of the Ilg Hot Air Electric Ventilating Company of Chicago. It is situated at 6300 W. Touhy Avenue.

Some speculate that part of the motivation to construct the tower was to celebrate the 600th anniversary of the Leaning Tower of Pisa. A more likely explanation is its original functional purpose, to store water for outdoor recreational swimming pools. In 1960, the descendants of Robert Ilg donated part of the park for the construction of the Leaning Tower YMCA. Other amenities of the employees' recreational park included a wooden toboggan run, which was in decay but still visible in the 1960s.

A study in 2014 concluded that the Leaning Tower of Niles is in need of about $600,000 in repairs.

On November 17, 2015, the Niles Village Board approved a proposal for the village to purchase the Leaning Tower from the YMCA for $10.  The Board also approved a contract to spend $550,000 to repair and renovate the building.

On March 15, 2016, Niles voters passed a non-binding referendum approving of the village spending the money to renovate the tower.

The Leaning Tower of Niles contains five bells.  Three of the bells are thought to be several hundred years old, and to have been cast in Italy.  How they came to be included in the tower is not known. 

The tower was listed on the National Register of Historic Places in 2020.

Symbol of city
In 1991, the village of Niles, Illinois, established a sister city pact with Pisa, Italy.  A US$1.2 million renovation of the Leaning Tower of Niles was started in 1995 by Mayor Nicholas Blase and the Board of Trustees, and was completed in 1996, improving the structure, façade and the Plaza area. The Leaning Tower Plaza area now has four fountains and a 30-foot pool.  Village web site and publications include images of the tower.  Leaning Tower Concert Series are summertime open-air music concerts sponsored by the village since the 1990s.

References

External links
Encyclopedia of Chicago, History of Niles, IL
Google earth Model
 

Towers completed in 1934
Inclined towers
Novelty buildings in Illinois
Niles, Illinois
Towers in Illinois
Buildings and structures in Cook County, Illinois
Tourist attractions in Cook County, Illinois
Folly buildings in the United States
Replica buildings
Inclined towers in the United States
1934 establishments in Illinois
Buildings and structures on the National Register of Historic Places in Cook County, Illinois